The Notaburi forest skink (Sphenomorphus helenae)  is a species of skink found in Thailand.

References

helenae
Reptiles described in 1927
Taxa named by Doris Mable Cochran
Reptiles of Thailand